North Korea first competed at the Asian Games in 1974.

Asian Games

Medals by Games

Medals by sport

References